William Oscar Handy (November 1, 1888 – April 8, 1945) was an American Negro league second baseman between 1911 and 1921.

Early life and career
A native of New Orleans, Louisiana, Handy made his Negro leagues debut in 1911 with the Brooklyn Royal Giants. He played with Brooklyn through 1914, then spent time with the St. Louis Giants before returning to Brooklyn in 1916. Handy went on to spend five seasons with the Bacharach Giants from 1917 to 1921. He died in New Orleans in 1945 at age 56.

References

Further reading
 Globe-Democrat staff (April 26, 1915). "Giants Defeat Field-Lippmans; Score, 11-2". St. Louis Globe-Democrat. p. 12

External links
  and Seamheads

1888 births
1945 deaths
Bacharach Giants players
Brooklyn Royal Giants players
St. Louis Giants players
20th-century African-American people
Baseball infielders